The Kawasaki C-5 (or KDC-5) was a 1930s Japanese civil high speed long range monoplane built for the Japanese Asahi Shimbun newspaper to gather and disseminate news across the Japanese empire.

Design and development
It was a scaled-up, civilianised version of the single-seat monoplane Kawasaki Ki-5 fighter with enclosed seating for its two crew and single passenger.

The C-5 was a low wing cantilever monoplane with an all metal structure and a metal covering with fabric covered control surfaces. The wings had a large root fairing, and tapered to rounded tips with part of centre section trailing edge cut away.

It was powered by an unsupercharged BMW VIIa V12 engine built under licence by Kawasaki, with the radiator mounted under the engine. A navigator's cockpit was provided behind the pilot, while an unglazed space between them could accommodate a passenger or equipment. The C-5's tailplane was mounted at the top of the main fuselage structure and braced from below. Its fin was triangular, carrying a straight-edged, upright rudder. Both rudder and elevators were balanced.

It had a fixed tailwheel landing gear. The undercarriage legs and most of the wheels were enclosed in broad spats, unusual only in that behind the legs they were split into inner and outer panels that could be opened on landing to act as air brakes. The wheels were fitted with conventional brakes.

Operational history
Earlier experience with the Ki-5 shortened the testing programme for the C-5. Flying from Kagamigahara, testing was carried out from the 17th to the 20th of February, 1934. The C-5 was then registered by Asahi Shimbun. At the time, it was the fastest Japanese civil aircraft flying, and had the greatest range, ideal for delivering news reports across the Japanese empire, at the time of the Second Sino-Japanese War. In March 1934 a non-stop flight was planned from Osaka to Hsinking (now named Changchun) in Manchuria, to bring news of celebrations of the anniversary of the creation of Manchuria, although the fuel froze not long after departure, ending the flight prematurely.

Despite this, the C-5 later set several speed and distance records.

The C-5 was used by Asahi Shimbun alongside the Kawasaki KDA-6/A-6 biplane, an enlarged Kawasaki Army Type 92 Fighter/KDA-5.

Specifications

References

Citations

Bibliography

Single-engined tractor aircraft
Low-wing aircraft
1930s Japanese civil utility aircraft
C-5